Prof. Emeritus S. P. Singh was an Indian jurist and educational administrator. He was the head of Faculty of Makerere University, during a  Foreign Assignment by Government of India to East Africa. He was Director General of MERI Educational Institutions, Sampla and former Vice Chancellor of Lucknow University, Lucknow. He was founder-Director General, Amity Law School, Noida. He was Professor & Head, Delhi University. He has also served as Director, Research & Studies, Institute of Company Secretaries of India (Govt. of India), New Delhi. His areas of specialization were Taxation, Corporate Law and Law of Tort and written books on the same.

Education  
He did his LL.M. from Cornell University United States - U.S.A. on an International Studies Fellowship of Ford Foundation, 1965–66, and his LL.D. from London.

Books
He authored books and gave his aesthetic legal opinion on various aspects of law, Taxation, Corporate Law and Law of Tort. His celebrated works are 'Law and Society' and 'Law of Tort'.

References

Academic staff of the University of Lucknow
1937 births
2020 deaths
Academic staff of Makerere University